The Constitution of the Kingdom of Westphalia was adopted by the Kingdom of Westphalia in 1807. It was drafted based on the French Constitution. The Constitution of the Kingdom of Westphalia is the oldest constitution in Germany. It served as a model for the constitutions of other States in the Confederation of the Rhine (e.g. the Constitution of the Grand Duchy of Frankfurt, named "Höchstes Organisations-Patent der Verfassung des Großherzogtums Frankfurt"). The Constitution was adopted after being promulgated by royal decree and published in the law bulletin on December 7, 1807.

Content

The Constitution mandates the integration of the Kingdom into the Napoleonic order, most notably that it takes part in the Confederation of the Rhine (Art. 5) and that its first king is Jérôme I, brother of Napoleon I (Art. 6 et seq.). Moreover, the metric system was introduced to Westphalia (Art. 17) as was the French Civil Code (Art. 45 et seq.).

It consists of thirteen titles and a preamble.
The first title establishes the territory of the Kingdom. The second title deals with the Confederation of the Rhine, while the third title deals with the king.
The fourth title aims at reforming society and state e.g. by granting equality before the law (Art. 10), reducing the privileges of the nobility (Art. 12) and abolishing serfdom (Art. 13).
The fifth title establishes the departments and the sixth title the Council of State as institutions of the executive. Government was based on four ministers, each of which heads a department (Art. 19, 20). Additionally, a Council of State consisting of 16 to 25 persons was created (Art. 21 et seq.).
Title seven regulates the estates of the realm. For legislative purposes, the king could convene the estates of the realm (Art. 29 et seq.). Titles eight to ten lay down the administrative structure of the kingdom. Title eleven deals with the judiciary. Title twelve mandates conscription. The last title is dedicated to the process of amending the constitution.

Implementation of the Constitution

The constitutional institutions began to function during the course of 1808 AD. However, the constitutional institutions were partly at odds with their framer's (Napoleon's) intended social reforms. On multiple occasion the estates of the realm, which was dominated by the landed nobility, blocked laws of the governmental reform agenda. The Departmental Colleges, which were tasked with electing the judges of the peace for the Cantons and proposing candidates for the Municipal Councils, were another constitutional body dominated by the formerly privileged nobility.

In order to implement reforms, the Westphalian Government started to bypass some constitutional organs. From 1810 AD onwards, the estates of the realm where not convened and the king started to rule by decree. Neither did he consult the Departmental-Colleges after the first round of appointments in 1808. When the Westphalia acquired territories of the former Electorate of Hanover in 1810 AD, it omitted the Colleges in the election processes for the region entirely.

However, the royal government was watching over the observance of the rights of Municipal Councils, which were the lowest of the executive administration officials associate representative body.

References

1807 documents
1807 in Germany
1807 in law
December 1807 events
Westphalia
Constitutions of Germany